Con rispetto parlando is a 1965 Italian black tragicomedy film written and directed by Marcello Ciorciolini for Turris Film. It stars Aroldo Tieri, Scilla Gabel, Renzo Palmer, Giusi Raspani Dandolo and Carlo Giuffré.

Plot
A girl returns to her home town to attend the funeral of the mayor. During the proceedings she witnesses how fake the people attending are, using the event for their own political gain. The funeral turns into an election campaign event.

Cast
 Aroldo Tieri 	 	
 Scilla Gabel 	 	
 Umberto D'Orsi 	 	
 Ugo Moretti 	 	
 Dominique Boschero 	 	
 Katina Ranieri 	 	
 Carlo Giuffrè 	 	
 Enzo Andronico 	 	
 Angelo Infanti 	 	
 Renzo Palmer 	 	
 Giusi Raspani Dandolo 	
 Carlo Sposito 	 	
 Nino Terzo 	 	
 Luca Sportelli

Production
The film was directed and written by Marcello Ciorciolini and produced by Antonio Colantuoni for Turris Film. Cinematographer Oberdan Trojani was hired to shoot the film, working with Giuseppe Ranieri. The score was composed by Riz Ortolani, and features the song "Giostra della vita", which was sung by Katyna Ranieri.

References

External links
 
 Con rispetto parlando at Variety Distribution

1965 films
1960s Italian-language films
Films directed by Marcello Ciorciolini
Italian comedy films
Films scored by Riz Ortolani
1965 comedy films
1960s Italian films